GXS is an American IT services company.

GXS may also refer to:

 a Singapore digital bank owned by Grab and Singtel
 a 2004 manual transmission model of Perodua Kelisa
 Gun X Sword, a series of Gun Sword anime episodes